Divaswapna is a 2021 Indian Gujarati drama film directed by Satish Davara. produced by Naresh Prajapati under the banner K. D. Films. The story is based on Divaswapna - An Educator's Reverie by Gijubhai Badheka. Starring Chetan Daiya, Pravin Gundecha, Garima Bhardwaj, Rittesh Mobh and Bimal Trivedi.

Cast
 Chetan Daiya as Kachra 
 Pravin Gundecha as Kanji
 Garima Bhardwaj as Anuas
 Rittesh Mobh as Narendra Sir
 Bimal Trivedi as Kalubha
 Kalpana Gagdekar as Nathi
 Devang Bhatt as Principal
 Richard Bhakti Klein as Professor of Israeli University

Filming
The film is set and shot in Padharia Village, Mehsana.

Soundtrack

Parth Pithadiya gave the Music of the film and the lyrics were penned by Naresh Prajapati . The Music of the film was released by K D Music Platform.

Release 
The film was released on 10 December 2021 in India.

Accolades
Divaswapan is the first-ever Gujarati film that received 53 awards and 35 nominations worldwide.

References

External links
 

2021 films
2020s Gujarati-language films
Indian drama films
2021 drama films